Crosby is a small village in the Allerdale district of the English county of Cumbria, historically within Cumberland, near the Lake District National Park. In 2020 the built-up area had an estimated population of 791. In 1870-72 the township had a population of 506. The local primary school is Crosscanonby St. John's Church of England School.

The only remaining public house in the village is The Stag Inn.

Governance
The village is in the parliamentary constituency of Workington. In the December 2019 general election, the Tory candidate for Workington, Mark Jenkinson, was elected the MP, overturning a 9.4 per cent Labour majority from the 2017 election to eject shadow environment secretary Sue Hayman by a margin of 4,136 votes. Until the December 2019 general election, the Labour Party had won the seat in every general election since 1979.The Conservative Party had only been elected once in Workington since World War II, at the 1976 by-election. Historically Crosby has been a Labour supporting area.

Before Brexit for the European Parliament its residents voted to elect MEP's for the North West England constituency.

For Local Government purposes it is in the Ellen & Gilcrux Ward of Allerdale Borough Council and the Maryport North Ward of Cumbria County Council.

The village also has its own Parish Council; Crosscanonby Parish Council.

See also
List of places in Cumbria

References

External links
Cumbria County History Trust: Crosscanonby (nb: provisional research only – see Talk page)

Villages in Cumbria
Crosscanonby